Dafydd ab Owain may refer to:

 Dafydd ab Owain Gwynedd (c. 1145–1203), Prince of Gwynedd 
 Dafydd ab Owain (bishop), bishop of St Asaph, 1503–1512